was a coastal town located in Nima District, Shimane Prefecture, Japan.

As of 2003, the town had an estimated population of 3,853 and a density of 53.63 persons per km2. The total area was 71.85 km2

On October 1, 2005, Yunotsu, along with the town of Nima (also from Nima District), was merged into the expanded city of Ōda.

See also
Groups of Traditional Buildings

Dissolved municipalities of Shimane Prefecture